The following is a list of presidents of Brown University From 1765 to the 1920s, the president was required by the University Charter to be of the Baptist denomination:

References

Brown University-related lists
Brown